Muḥammad ibn al-Ḳāsim al-Nuwayrī al-Iskandarānī al-Mālikī (fl. 1365–1373) was a Muslim historian and native of Alexandria in the tradition of secular local historiography. He wrote a three-volume history ostensibly of the Cypriot-led crusade that sacked his city in October 1365, to which he was an eyewitness. In fact, as his contemporary Ibn Ḥajar al-ʿAsḳalānī noted, the Kitāb al-Ilmām fīmā jarat bihi ʾl-aḥkām al-maḳḍiyya fī wāḳiʿat al-Iskandariyya mostly meanders through the earlier history of the city, leaving little room for the crusade with which he begins. It includes the story of Alexander the Great and Aristotle, and even many events unrelated to the city. It was written between AH 767 (AD 1365–56) and 775 (1373–74). The dates of al-Nuwayrī's birth and death are unknown. There is a manuscript copy of al-Masʿūdī's Murūj in al-Nuwayrī's handwriting.

The Kitāb al-Ilmām was edited in six volumes by Aziz Atiya between 1968 and 1973. Atiya regards al-Nuwayrī as the most important historian for the crusade of 1365 from the Egyptian perspective.

Notes

Bibliography

Historians from the Mamluk Sultanate
Writers from Alexandria
14th-century Egyptian historians
Muslims of the Alexandrian Crusade